Outsiders is a British comedy panel show broadcast on Dave. Pairs of comedians compete in survival-themed tasks for badges awarded by the host David Mitchell. In the first series, which premiered in September 2021, the contestants were Toussaint Douglass, Ed Gamble, Kerry Godliman, Jessica Knappett, Jamali Maddix and Lou Sanders. The show was widely compared to Taskmaster, a Dave original programme where comedians were set tasks to complete as individuals; it had moved to Channel 4 in 2020.

Production
The panel show Outsiders was announced alongside other Dave productions—Question Team, The Island, British As Folk—on 5 May 2021. Its six-episode run of hour-long episodes features David Mitchell judging three pairs of comedians: Toussaint Douglass and Kerry Godliman; Ed Gamble and Lou Sanders; and Jessica Knappett and Jamali Maddix. The first series aired on Wednesdays at 10p.m. It debuted on 29 September 2021.

Mitchell was approached by producers with a Scouting-based theme where comedians compete for badges. To add significance to the concept, he suggested the programme should be "about the survival of humans in the wild", with specific reference to the COVID-19 pandemic, and as such it was filmed entirely outdoors. Mitchell reported good relations with Dave, who welcomed the production team's input and were pleased with the final product. The filming lasted a week and saw good weather. The tent in which Mitchell resided was designed after his personality, with old-style furniture and military paraphernalia. While contestants slept in tents overnight, Mitchell returned to his home.

According to Mitchell, in the first series, each pairing had tension within it, but not nastiness. Godliman positioned herself as a keen camper but her teammate Douglass felt he was doing most of the work; Gamble was competitive but his partner Sanders did not care about the results; and Knappett acted as "a sort of adoring pretend-wife" to Maddix, who had "a real survival streak". Mitchell described his role as "a slightly befuddled, irascible and indecisive leader".

The series drew comparisons to Taskmaster, where contestants compete individually in a number of tasks that are then judged in a studio show. Taskmaster was originally a Dave programme, but moved to Channel 4 in 2020. It had been one of Dave's most successful original programming, with high rating figures, a number of awards and several international adaptations. The contestants in the first series, other than Douglass, had all appeared in Taskmaster; three of them had won their series. Mitchell said that, rather than modelling his hosting style on Greg Davies, the eponymous Taskmaster, he drew on his chairing of the radio show The Unbelievable Truth.

Cast

Series 1
 Toussaint Douglass
 Ed Gamble
 Kerry Godliman
 Jessica Knappett
 Jamali Maddix
 Lou Sanders

Series 2
 Maisie Adam
 Fatiha El-Ghorri
 Darren Harriott
 Jessica Hynes
 Phil Wang
 Joe Wilkinson

Reception
Steve Bennett of Chortle rated the show 3.5 out of five stars, praising the relationships between the contestants, and the "dry wit" of Douglass. Bennett reviewed that Mitchell is "less mercurial and arbitrary" than Greg Davies, but that the tasks are "relatively mundane". Stuart Heritage of The Guardian criticised that in contrast with Taskmaster, the challenges in Outsiders are mostly not open-ended and the comedians' responses are not unique to their personalities. However, Heritage praised the line-up, particularly Sanders, and the fireside conversations between the group. Bruce Dessau gave a positive review in Beyond the Joke, finding it "a lot of fun to watch" and praising Mitchell as "a great host, playing up to his bumptious persona".

References

External links
Official website

2020s British comedy television series
2021 British television series debuts
Dave (TV channel) original programming
English-language television shows